The thirteenth season of British science fiction television series Doctor Who began on 30 August 1975 with the story Terror of the Zygons, and ended with The Seeds of Doom. This is the second series to feature the Fourth Doctor, played by Tom Baker, with Philip Hinchcliffe producing and Robert Holmes script editing. It was ranked as readers' favourite season in Doctor Who Magazine issue 413.

Casting

Main cast 
 Tom Baker as the Fourth Doctor
 Elisabeth Sladen as Sarah Jane Smith
 Ian Marter as Harry Sullivan

Tom Baker continued his role as The Fourth Doctor along with Sarah Jane Smith (Elisabeth Sladen). Harry Sullivan, played by Ian Marter, departed in Terror of the Zygons and reappeared in The Android Invasion as a guest star.

Recurring cast
 Nicholas Courtney as Brigadier Lethbridge-Stewart
 John Levene as Sergeant Benton

Nicholas Courtney returned as Brigadier Lethbridge-Stewart in Terror of the Zygons having last appeared in Robot. John Levene makes his final appearance as Sergeant Benton in The Android Invasion after six years in the role.

Serials 

Terror of the Zygons was produced as part of the production schedule for Season 12, but was held for transmission from the end of that season to the beginning of Season 13, to coincide with a move from the new season starting at the beginning of the calendar year, to starting in late summer. Terror of the Zygons was also the last appearance of the Brigadier until Mawdryn Undead in Season 20. The season took a transmission break of two weeks over the Christmas 1975 period, between the broadcasts of The Android Invasion and The Brain of Morbius.

Broadcast
The entire season was broadcast from 30 August 1975 to 6 March 1976.

Home media

VHS releases

Betamax releases

Video 2000 releases

Laserdisc releases

DVD and Blu-ray releases

In print

References

Bibliography
 

1975 British television seasons
1976 British television seasons
Season 13
Season 13
13